James Michael Meder (born April 12, 1991) is a former American football defensive tackle. He played college football at Ashland University. He has been nicknamed the "Pierogi Prince of Parma."

Early years
Meder played high school football at Valley Forge High School in Parma Heights, Ohio. He was named first-team all-conference and was tabbed the defensive player of the year as a senior. He was also named second-team All-Ohio. Meder lettered four times in wrestling and three times in football. He was a state runner-up in the OHSAA Division I heavyweight class in wrestling his senior year.

College career
Meder played football for the Ashland Eagles from 2010 to 2013.

Professional career

Baltimore Ravens
Meder signed with the Baltimore Ravens on May 11, 2014 after going undrafted in the 2014 NFL draft. He was released by the Ravens on August 30 and signed to the team's practice squad on August 31, 2014. He was released by the Ravens on November 10, 2014.

Cleveland Browns
Meder was signed to the Cleveland Browns' practice squad on November 12, 2014. He was promoted to the active roster on December 27, 2014. He made his NFL debut on December 28, 2014 against the Baltimore Ravens.
 
On March 7, 2016, the Browns re-signed Meder. On December 24, 2016, Meder blocked a potential-game tying 32-yard field goal with 3:49 left in the game against the San Diego Chargers to help the Browns win their first game of the season and snap a 17-game losing streak. They won the game by a score of 20–17. He was then named AFC Special Teams Player of the Week, becoming the first defensive lineman in Browns history to win the award.

On November 21, 2017, Meder was placed on injured reserve with an ankle injury.

Meder was waived by the Browns on September 2, 2018.

Seattle Seahawks
On January 14, 2019, Meder signed a reserve/future contract with the Seattle Seahawks. He was released on August 31, 2019.

Detroit Lions
On December 18, 2019, Meder was signed by the Detroit Lions.

References

External links
Cleveland Browns bio

Living people
1991 births
People from Parma Heights, Ohio
Players of American football from Ohio
Seattle Seahawks players
Sportspeople from Cuyahoga County, Ohio
American football defensive tackles
Ashland Eagles football players
Baltimore Ravens players
Cleveland Browns players
Detroit Lions players